Paul J. Thomas is an American farmer, businessman, and politician serving as a member of the North Dakota House of Representatives from the 6th district. Elected in November 2020, he assumed office on December 1, 2020.

Early life and education 
Thomas was born in Karlsruhe, North Dakota He earned a Bachelor of Science degree in agricultural economics from North Dakota State University in 1996.

Career 
Thomas served as a member of the Velva, North Dakota City Commission and Velva Sales Tax Committee. He was vice president of the North Dakota Corn Growers Association and North Dakota Farm Bureau. He was elected to the North Dakota House of Representatives in November 2020 and assumed office on December 1, 2020.

References 

Living people
Republican Party members of the North Dakota House of Representatives
People from McHenry County, North Dakota
North Dakota State University alumni
Year of birth missing (living people)